Florenciella may refer to:

Florenciella (alga), a genus of algae in the class Dictyochophyceae
Florenciella (fish), a genus of fishes in the family Epigonidae